Sixteen Mile Creek is a stream in the municipality of Lake of Bays, District Municipality of Muskoka in Central Ontario, Canada. It is part of the Great Lakes Basin and flows from Hickory Lake to its mouth at the Boyne River. The Boyne River flows to the Lake of Bays, then via the Muskoka River, and the Moon River and Musquash River to Georgian Bay on Lake Huron.

Tributaries
Spaniel Creek (left)

References

Sources

Rivers of Muskoka District